The Negostina is a right tributary of the river Siret in Romania. It flows into the Siret in the town Siret. A 14th-century castle, built by prince Sas of Moldavia is located on its banks.

References

Rivers of Romania
Rivers of Suceava County